ND5 may refer to:

 MT-ND5, a protein
 China Railways Class ND5, a diesel-electric locomotive
 North Dakota Highway 5
 An aerobic, rod-shaped ultramicrobacteria